Keche ( often called The Skill Team) is a Ghanaian musical hip-life duo formed in 2004 consisting of Joshua Kojo Ampah and Andrew Kofi Cudjoe. Keche means "skills" in the Akan language. The duo rose to fame with their debut album Pressure (2008). Keche has multiple nominations under their belt and their song Sokode topped several music charts across the African continent.

Early life 
In the early part of the year 2000, Joshua took up a hobby of playing basketball and football at St. John Senior Secondary School. This was where he met Andrew who was a student and an athlete there. Joshua hails from the Central region, while Andrew is from the Western region. They both spoke the native Fante  and hence had an oral telepathy as they did musical freestyles.

By the year 2005, the duo had recorded several demos and mixtapes in studios like One blaze and Dons mic, all in the Tema Metropolis. Their recording quest drove them to the shores of the Highly Spiritual studio owned by legendary sound engineer Kaywa.

In 2008, Keche released their first single "Omogemi",  which was followed by "Ring my bell" which featured Sarkodie.

They are known for the songs Sokode, Aluguntugui, Diabetes, Pressure, amongst others. In 2011, the duo was recognized as a Global Ambassador for Peace by the then Liberia's president, her Excellency Ellen Johnson Sirleaf. Following that, the group also performed  at the UN Peace concert in Monrovia, Liberia in 2014 which gave the group recognition across Africa. In 2019, the group signed a record deal with Gem Rhythms, a subsidiary of Gem Multimedia.

Discography 

 PRESSURE                       - 2008
 SOKODE                           - 2011
 ALUGUNTUGUI                - 2012
 BODY LOTION                  - 2013
 DIABETES                         - 2014
 HALLELUJAH                    - 2014
 FINEBOY                           - 2014
 CASE                                 - 2015
 MONICA                            - 2015
 SHAME ON YOU              - 2015
 ATINKA                             -  2016
 COCOA SEASON             - 2016
 NEXT LEVEL                    - 2017
 SHOW SOMETHING        - 2017
 THEY SAY                         - 2018
 FLAVOR                            - 2018
 EXCITING                         - 2018
 AKUMA                             - 2018
 YOU WAN CRY                - 2018
 GRACE                             - 2019
 ODO                                  - 2019
 TODAY                              - 2019
 SAME GIRL                       - 2020
 NO DULLING                     - 2020

Videography 

 OMOGEMI                                - 2008
 PRESSURE                              - 2009
 SOKODE                                  - 2011
 ALUGUNTUGUI                       - 2012
 DIABETES                               - 2014
 CASE                                       - 2015
 NEXT LEVEL                           - 2017
 SHOW SOMETHING               - 2017
 THEY SAY                               - 2018
 ODO                                         - 2019
 TODAY                                     - 2019
 SAME GIRL                              - 2020
 NO DULLING                            - 2020

Album 

 Pressure

Gallery

Awards 

 4syte Music Video Awards 2012 Winner- Best Choreographed Video.
 Liberia's Global Ambassadors for Peace.
 VGMA 2011 Nominee- Hip Life/Hip Hop Artist of the Year.
 VGMA 2012 Nominee- Best Group, Hip Life Song of the Year, Popular Song of the Year.
 The Pan African International Recognition Awards and Annual Discourse (PAIR-AWARDS)-Best West African Artist of the Year
 2017 4syte Music Video Awards; Nominations for Best Group of the Year
 2018 4syte Music Video Awards; Nominations for Most Popular Video.
 2019 4syte Music Video Awards; Nominations for Best Video. 
 2020 Ghana Music Awards, USA; Winner - Best Group Of The Year.
2021 Vodafone Ghana Music Awards, Nominations for Hipife/Hiphop Artist of the Year 

 2021 Vodafone Ghana Music Award ; Winner - Best Collaboration

References 

Ghanaian musicians